Julia Krasko (Russian: Юлия Красько; born April 6, 1971 in Moscow, Russia) is a violinist and a professor.

Biography
Julia Krasko was born into a family of musicians. Her father, Grigory Krasko, was a concertmaster of the Moscow Philharmonic Orchestra. Her mother, Olga Kondratieva, is a pianist and a professor in Gnessin State Musical College. She graduated from Gnessin Music School, where she studied under Irina Svetlova, and from Moscow Conservatory, where her teacher was Maya Glezarova. In 1992 she was awarded 1st prize at the Paganini competition. She currently teaches at the Moscow Conservatory.

Discography
Prokofiev, Bartok, Stravinsky (Russian Disc, 1996)
Love’s Joy And Sorrow. Julia Krasko Plays Fritz Kreisler (Delos Productions, 1999)
Glazunov: Symphony No 1, Violin Concerto (Chandos Records, 1999)

References

20th-century classical violinists
Women classical violinists
1971 births
Living people
20th-century women musicians
21st-century women musicians
21st-century classical violinists